The Brabus 800 iBusiness from Brabus is an upgraded version of the Mercedes-Benz G-Class. The vehicle was presented at the Geneva Motor Show in 2014.

Engine / mileage 
The Brabus 800 iBusiness is equipped with an 800 hp V12 engine. In 4.2 seconds, the Mercedes Tempo reaches 100 km/h, while the fuel consumption is 17 liters per 100 kilometers. The seven-speed automatic transmission was combined with all-wheel drive.

Equipment 
Inside is a 15.2-inch TFT display in 16:9 format, integrated iPad mini, a Mac mini, an iPod Touch and an Apple TV. The tables are foldable and rotatable. A wireless modem with WLAN and a Brabus proprietary remote control App networks the screen and all devices. The headliner is made of leather and the back seat has been provided with ventilation. There is also a sound system inside.

Body 
The body of the Mercedes is relatively edged. The xenon headlamps have been upgraded with LED daytime running lights and the front spoiler and the radiator grille are provided with shutters. The tires consist of 23-inch tires and the footboards have LEDs that light up when the doors are opened.

References 

Mercedes-Benz G-Class
800 iBusiness
Luxury sport utility vehicles
Off-road vehicles
Mid-size sport utility vehicles
All-wheel-drive vehicles
Cars introduced in 2014